The Cook Islands competed at the 2017 World Aquatics Championships in Budapest, Hungary from 14 July to 30 July.

Swimming

Cook Islands has received a Universality invitation from FINA to send two male swimmers to the World Championships.

References

Nations at the 2017 World Aquatics Championships
Cook Islands at the World Aquatics Championships
2017 in Cook Islands sport